Tacacá  is a typical dish of Northern Brazil (mostly consumed in Pará, Amazonas, Acre, Amapá and Roraima). It is made with jambu (a native variety of paracress), and tucupi (a broth made with wild manioc), cooked tapioca starch (“goma de tapioca” - manioc), as well as dried shrimps and fragrant, small yellow peppers known as “pimenta de cheiro”. It is be served hot in bowl made from Amazonian gourd known as cuia.

See also
 List of Brazilian dishes
 List of soups

Brazilian soups